Chinatowns in Asia are widespread with a large concentration of overseas Chinese in East Asia and Southeast Asia and ethnic Chinese whose ancestors came from southern China—particularly the provinces of Guangdong, Fujian, and Hainan—and settled in countries such as Brunei, Cambodia, East Timor, Indonesia, India, Laos, Malaysia, Myanmar, the Philippines, Singapore, Sri Lanka, Thailand, Vietnam, Japan and Korea centuries ago—starting as early as the Tang dynasty, but mostly notably in the 17th through the 19th centuries (during the reign of the Qing dynasty), and well into the 20th century. Today the Chinese diaspora in Asia is largely concentrated in Southeast Asia however the legacy of the once widespread overseas Chinese communities in Asia is evident in the many Chinatowns that are found across East, South and Southeast Asia.

These ethnic Chinese arrived from southern mainland China and were mainly Chinese people of Cantonese (Vietnam, Cambodia, Singapore, Thailand, Malaysia), Hakka (India, Cambodia, Sri Lanka, Malaysia, Singapore, Indonesia, Thailand, Myanmar, Brunei), Hokkien (Philippines, Singapore, Malaysia, Indonesia, Cambodia, Myanmar), and Teochew/Chaozhou (Cambodia, Laos, Thailand, Vietnam, Singapore, Malaysia) stock and pockets of Hainanese, Hokchew and Henghwa in some countries.

Binondo, located in Manila, Philippines, is considered by many to be the oldest existing Chinatown in the world, having been officially established in 1594 by the Spanish colonial government in the Philippines that set off the area as a permanent settlement for Chinese who had converted to Christianity. (A separate area, then called the Parian, was allotted for unconverted Chinese.)

The ethnic Chinese represent a large minority population in most of these countries—with Singapore being the exception where Chinese-origin Singaporeans form the majority of the population. Chinese Indonesians and Chinese Filipinos have adopted to Indonesian and Filipino ways, respectively. The Thai Chinese and Chinese Cambodian people have generally assimilated into the larger Thai and Cambodian population, respectively.

Traditional areas of Chinese settlement in Asia
Historically and traditionally, Southeast Asia, South Asia and to some extent East Asia have been the traditional areas of Overseas Chinese settlement within Asia. Migrations of ethnic Chinese in the eighteenth and nineteenth century to other parts of Asia, primarily went to Southeast Asia with smaller numbers going to South Asia. As a result, Chinatowns emerged in many of these areas of Chinese settlement.

Specific Asian Chinatowns

Afghanistan
In the Taimani area of the capital Kabul, there is an office building named China Town, with spaces for Chinese traders and merchants, as well as a small market.

Cambodia

Phnom Penh Chinatown might not be as fancy as other countries, but it is still one of those places to visit if one want to learn more about Chinese history in Cambodia.

It is currently situated in the areas around Orussey Market and Central Market. It also lies on Charles de Gaulle Street and Kampuchea Krom Boulevard (west of Central Market) as well as Monivong Boulevard. One of the streets worth visiting to experience Chinese influence is Street 166.

Food and shops

In Phnom Penh's Chinatown, visitors can find many delicious foods. There, one can find grilled squids, soy milk, fried banana, tea egg, lamian mee (mostly in Central Market and around Orussey Market). One of the best restaurants in Chinatown is Thmor Da Restaurant, and Monivong Boulevard also has many good Chinese restaurants. Street 136 also has many Chinese marts and good Chinese restaurants.

During nighttime, the outskirts of Orussey Market became a food paradise for food lovers. There one can find specialized street food such as grilled seafood, grilled beef on the skewer, char kway teow, fried rice and stir-fried noodles. Those foods were also much cheaper than in most restaurants. Each year before the Moon Cake Festival and Dragon Boat Festival, handmade moon cakes and zongzi are sold on the street side (especially Street 166 and Charles de Gaulle Street). During Chinese New Year, freshly roasted ducks and pigs can be found around Orussey Market.

Apart from foods, visitors can also find Feng Shui masters and Chinese herb shops in Chinatown (especially on Street 166 and Street 107).

During Festival:

During Chinese New Year, visitors can view dragon dances and lion dances in Chinatown (mostly in Charles de Gaulle Street, Street 136, Street 107, Street 136, and many other smaller streets.) During Spirit Parade Day, parades can be seen along Charles de Gaulle Street.

History

Cambodia started to get into contact with China as early as 1st century CE, but it is only until the 19th century that many Chinese started to immigrate to Cambodia. This is what motivated the French colonists in Cambodia to build Central Market in which later it became the country's most notable Chinatown. Most Chinese settlers in Cambodia are Teochew people followed by some Cantonese, Hokkien, and Hakka.

East Timor
Dili, East Timor, has a Chinatown business area on Hudilaran Street.

India
Most of the Chinese of Calcutta live in or near is a Chinatown in Calcutta. Many Hakkas live in a community known as Tangra, which used to be dominated by leather tanneries (the Hindu majority will not touch cattle) and Chinese restaurants. There are roughly 2–3,000 Chinese in Calcutta in modern day, but there were a peak of 20,000 in the mid-20th century.

Another Chinatown is in Byculla, Mumbai; however, it has diminished in population as many of its Indian-born Chinese ethnic residents after denied Indian passport, a backlash from the 1962 Indo-China war and better economic opportunities to foreign countries, such as Australia, Canada and the United States. Calcutta\'s Chinatown facing extinction over new rule – Taipei Times

Indonesia

In Indonesia, many Chinese reside within the city centres of Java, Sumatra, and Borneo. There is also a sizeable Chinese population in small towns and villages across Sumatra and Borneo. In Java, especially in Jakarta, Chinese people reside in the northern part of the province, such as Glodok, Mangga Dua, Pinangsia, Kelapa Gading, Grogol, Pantai Indah Kapuk, and Pluit. Other Chinatowns in Java are located in the Tangerang city center; Suryakencana Street in Bogor, West Java; Jalan Pekojan in Semarang; Lasem in Central Java; Kampung Ketandan in Yogyakarta; and Kya-Kya in Surabaya.

As for Sumatra and Borneo, many cities and towns have significant Chinese populations that can be found dispersed in and around the city, these are:
Bangka Belitung – Pangkal Pinang, Sungailiat, Tanjung Pandan, Manggar, Toboali and Muntok (with Hakka majority)
North Sumatra – Medan (Kesawan), Binjai, Lubuk Pakam, Pematangsiantar, Rantau Prapat, Tanjungbalai, Tebing Tinggi, Sibolga (with Hokkien majority)
Riau – Pekanbaru, Dumai, Selat Panjang, Bagansiapiapi, Panipahan, Bagan Batu (with Hokkien majority)
Riau Islands – Batam, Tanjung Pinang, Tanjung Balai Karimun (with Hokkien majority)
South Sumatra – Palembang (with Hakka and Cantonese majority)
West Kalimantan – Pontianak, Ketapang, and Bengkayang (with Teochew majority) and Singkawang (with Hakka majority).

"Chinatown" in Indonesian is known as Pecinan or Kampung Cina.

Japan

In Japan, ethnic Chinese immigrants are called . The largest Chinatown in Asia and one of the largest in the world is located in Yokohama and the city of Kobe has a growing Chinatown. Nagasaki's Chinatown (Japanese:) was founded in 1698 AD. Most Chinese immigrants in Japan were from Taiwan who arrived during the Japanese colonial period.

The Ikebukuro district of Tokyo is home to many ethnic Chinese who arrived in the 1980s. Though in Tokyo, this Chinatown is quite small and unannounced than the Yokohama's Chinatown just to the south of the city.

Korea, South

South Korea's Chinatowns are located in Incheon and Seoul. Seoul's Chinatown is unofficial. A newly planned Chinatown was built in suburban Goyang (Ilsan) in 2005.

Incheon's Chinatown is Korea's only official Chinatown. It is in Jung-gu and was formed in 1884. It used to be the largest such Chinatown in South Korea before the exodus of Chinese from the county. In 2002, to capitalize on the large number of Mainland Chinese visitors who were visiting South Korea, the Inchon city council planned to revive its moribund Chinatown at a cost of US$6.2 million (worth about 6.5 billion South Korean won). It claims to be the largest Chinatown in South Korea, and features an 11-metre high Chinese-style gateway.

Busan is also considering reviving its Chinatown.

Due to institutionalized anti-Chinese discrimination during the Park Chung Hee administration and lack of economic opportunities, many ethnic Chinese left South Korea during the 1960 and 1970s for Taiwan or the United States. Since then the actual Chinese populations of many Chinatowns in South Korea declined. Many business in these Chinatowns are actually owned by ethnic Koreans.

Laos
Vientiane contains a Chinatown on Samsenthai Road.

Malaysia

With around a quarter of the Malaysian population of Chinese origin, urban districts with a large concentration of ethnic Chinese are to be found across the country. The term Chinatown is rarely used to refer to such places locally except for tourism purposes, particularly in reference to Petaling Street—the centre of Kuala Lumpur's Chinese business district and is predominantly Cantonese-speaking.

In the north of the country, the population of Georgetown on the island of Penang is largely Hokkien-speaking, and close to 90% of the population is of Chinese origin. Other urban areas with high proportion of Chinese population in the city centre include Kuching (90%), Ipoh (82%), Kota Kinabalu (78%) and Malacca (62%).

In the East Coast region of Peninsular Malaysia, the city of Kuala Terengganu has an old Chinese settlement known as Kampung Cina. This area, located at the river mouth of Terengganu River that empties into the South China Sea, is one of Southeast Asia's early Chinese settlements (with many of the current buildings dating back to late 1800s and early 1900s) and contains stately ancestral homes, temples, townhouses, and business establishments. It is a significant area to the city's Chinese community and culture, with many preservation projects are being carried out to ensure the safeguard of the heritage buildings. Kampung Cina is also a major tourist attraction in Kuala Terengganu.

With such high concentration of urban Chinese, Malaysian cities rank among the largest Chinatowns in the world.

Myanmar

The primary Chinatown in Myanmar is situated in Downtown Yangon within the Lanmadaw township and Latha township townships. Other Chinatowns exist in Myanmar's major cities such as Mandalay.

The Kokang Chinese are another significant group in northern Shan State who make up 30–40% of the total Chinese Burmese population. Kokang was founded in 1739 as the Chiefdom of Kokang and became populated by Ming loyalists during the rise of the Qing dynasty. Kokang today is a self-administered zone with a 90% Han Chinese population.

Pakistan

There is a sizeable community of Chinese people in Pakistan, based largely in urban centres. The areas of Clifton and DHA in Karachi have many Chinese restaurants and businesses and are sometimes dubbed as Chinatown.

Philippines

The best-known Chinatown in the Philippines is the district of Binondo in Manila. Binondo is the oldest Chinatown in the world, having been established in 1594, when the Spanish colonial government of the Philippine islands restricted the residence of Chinese who had converted to Christianity to this area. Unconverted Christians were allotted a different enclave, then called the Parian (no longer in existence as a Chinatown).

Many prominent Chinese Filipino families have roots in this district. Among the attractions of Binondo is Divisoria, a shopping area popular with people engaging in bargain shopping.

Chinese settlement—who were predominantly Hokkien—in the Philippines pre-dates the coming of the Spanish in 1521. Chinese merchants have been trading with the indigenous tribes of the islands since the 8th century. During Spanish colonial rule, the Chinese held an intermediate place in Filipino society as middlemen between the Spanish upper-class and the native Filipinos.

During the rule of Ferdinand Marcos, bitterness against Chinese Filipinos grew, starting in 1972. Many of the community went to Venezuela, or to North America—especially United States—Australia, or any other countries. In the first ever visit to Manila's Chinatown by a Filipino president, President Gloria Macapagal Arroyo, who is of part Chinese descent herself, recognized the efforts and contributions of Chinese Filipinos.

In 2006, plans were drawn up to construct a newer but synthetic Chinatown in shopping-mall form along Diosdado Macapagal Boulevard in the Manila Bay area of Manila which would rival the nearly-400-year-old original Chinatown in the Binondo district. It was to be dubbed "Neo Chinatown” and was to be designed based on traditional Chinese architecture. It was to be a joint venture of local Chinese Filipino and Mainland Chinese investors. Neo Chinatown sought to replicate the vibrant night market scene found on the streets of Hong Kong and Taipei.

Davao Chinatown, also known as Mindanao Chinatown, is the only Chinatown in Mindanao, located in Davao City. In 2003, Mayor Rodrigo Duterte issued an executive order declaring portions of Barangay 27-C and Barangay 30-C, where streets are mostly occupied by Filipino-Chinese with their respective businesses, as Davao City Chinatown and constituting the Davao City Chinatown Development Council (DCCDC). The creation of the DCCDC aims to assist in the active formulation and implementation of policies in an area that has great commercial, historical, economic and social significance to Davao City.

At around 44 hectares in size, Davao Chinatown is located at the center of numerous business establishments, of which a great majority is owned by Chinese Filipinos who were either born in the country or are naturalized Filipino citizens who trace their roots to mainland China. These business establishments include about 30 banks, and a wide variety of restaurants offering not only Chinese cuisine but also Korean, Filipino and the like. Chinese-themed malls and shops also pockmark this business enclave of Davao City, which is globally known as the international gateway and most progressive city of Mindanao. It is the only Chinatown in the Philippines with its own seaport, which is Sta. Ana Wharf.

Singapore

Singapore, a multi-racial, but predominantly Chinese, country has a relatively large Chinatown in a district to the south of the river originally designated for Chinese settlement by Sir Stamford Raffles. It remains known as Chinatown in English, and Niú chē shuǐ (牛车水, lit. 'ox cart water') in Chinese, and the MRT (rapid transit) station that serves the area is known by both names. The area around the station serves as a tourist attraction selling souvenirs, and also locally frequented areas including a number of traditional stores, markets, restaurants, apartment complexes, nightclubs, and Chinese temples including the Buddha Tooth Relic temple, and the Thian Hock Keng Temple. Festival markets also set up in the area during special events in the Lunar calendar such as the Chinese New Year or the Mid-Autumn Festival.

Chinatown is not exclusively Chinese; the Masjid Jamae and the Sri Mariamman Hindu Temple can also be found off the main street.

In 1989, several areas in Chinatown were earmarked by the Urban Redevelopment Authority as conservation areas. Under that programme, the historic streets of Kreta Ayer Road, Telok Ayer Street, Ann Siang Hill and Bukit Pasoh Road were restored. Because of its proximity to the administrative centre and the central business district, specialized professional and consultancy businesses as well as upmarket retail and dining establishments have displaced many traditional businesses in the historical shophouses in Chinatown.

Thailand

Chinese Thais of Teochew (Chaozhou) descent are the dominant group of ethnic Chinese, with smaller numbers of those of Cantonese and Hakka origin as well. Rama I was the founder and the first monarch of the reigning House of Chakri of Siam. His mother, Daoreung (original name Yok), was part-Chinese

The Chinatown of Bangkok is located on Yaowarat Road and Sampeng Lane, including Huai Khwang District especially Pracha Rat Bamphen Road. It is considered as the "New Chinatown" of modern Chinese such as students, tourists.

The city of Phuket is home to Thailand's second Chinatown, which is on Phang Nga Road, Thalang Road, Krabi Road, Phuket Road, Ratsada Road, Yaowarat Road, Deebook Road and Thepkrasattree Road Phuket. It was founded by early Chinese settlers.

There is a Chinese community in northern Thailand, in a town called Mae Salong, near Myanmar. After the defeat and exile of Kuomintang from mainland China by forces led by Mao Zedong, several Kuomintang army divisions in Yunnan province fled into neighboring Myanmar. After being expelled from that country, the mainland Chinese veterans fought Thai communists on behalf of the Thai government and were granted citizenship. Mae Salong was established by veterans of the Kuomintang army 93rd Division. Many Thai-born Chinese generations have relocated to Taiwan, although their fathers and grandfathers refuse because of an owed apology from the KMT for refusing them in the 1950s and 1960s. They have since made a retirement home-styled town, called "the home to the glorious people" (榮民之家). Today, Mae Salong is a spot for tourists from Taiwan and mainland China.

A shopping district in Chiang Mai city called Trok Lao Zhou has been dubbed as the "Chinatown of Chiang Mai". It is a historic alleyway within Waroros Market (Kad Luang) that is a source of Chinese and Hmong.

The community of Chak Ngaeo in Bang Lamung District has been dubbed as the "Chinatown of the East". Today, it has been promoted as a new cultural attraction.

United Arab Emirates
There are approximately 180,000 Chinese people in the United Arab Emirates, 150,000 of whom are in Dubai. Many Chinese expatriates hail from the Wenzhou region.

In 2018, Emirati-based developer Emaar announced a project to build the Middle East's largest Chinatown in Dubai Creek Harbour. The plan itself coincided with the visit of China's paramount leader, Xi Jinping, to the country.

In Abu Dhabi, a small Chinatown exists in Madinat Zayed.

Vietnam

Ethnic Chinese have been moving to Vietnam for centuries. During the transition of power from Ming dynasty to Qing dynasty in China, many anti-Qing elements fled prosecution and came to Vietnam. To avoid angering the Qing government, Vietnam government decided to send them south to populate the scarcely populated area. They pioneered many settlements in the south of the country including Saigon, or as it is known today, Ho Chi Minh City (Hồ Chí Minh). Ho Chi Minh City's Chinatown is the Cholon district which has been a stronghold for the Chinese-Vietnamese community since the late 1770s, when many Cantonese and Teochew Chinese arrived. Its main thoroughfares are Nguyen Trai Street (Nguyễn Trãi) and Tran Hung Dao Street (Trần Hưng Đạo). The Cholon area was the bastion of ethnic Chinese Vietnamese free enterprise until the Vietnamese communist government confiscated private property in the area.

Prior to Sino-Vietnamese War the Vietnamese government decided to expel the Sino-Vietnamese from the Northern part of the country hence the second wave of boat people many of whom went to China.

After the period of the Vietnam War and Sino-Vietnamese War (the late 1970s and early 1980s), many Chinese Vietnamese (called in Vietnamese the Viet Hoa) along with their ethnic Vietnamese, or the Viet Kinh, compatriots fled the country as "boat people". However, this third wave were mostly ethnic Vietnamese. As a result, there are many overseas Chinese Vietnamese communities in Australia, Canada, France, Germany, and the United States. Nevertheless, Vietnam still has a remnant ethnic Chinese community.

Discrimination and anti-Chinese sentiment

In 1997, the Asian financial crisis loomed over Asia and caused political turmoil. Although several Southeast Asian leaders such as Malaysia's prime minister blamed the Western-dominated International Monetary Fund for the economic problems.

References

External links

 Chinatown.SG – Singapore Chinatown's official website
 index Singapore Chinatown
 Welcome to Hakka Community – Twilight descends on Calcutta's Chinatown
 Singapore's Chinatown
 The Chinatown of Malacca, Malaysia

 
Asia